Jeff Wasserburger (born January 8, 1961) is an American politician and a Republican member of the Wyoming State Senate, representing the 23rd district since January 5, 2015.  Wasserburger previously served in the Wyoming House of Representatives between 1995 and 2007.

Political career
Wasserburger first ran for the Wyoming House of Representatives in 1994.  He served six terms before retiring due to self-imposed term limits.

Elections

2014
Incumbent Republican State Senator John Hines retired, leaving the District 23 Senate seat open. Wasserburger defeated John Raney in the Republican primary, and then won the general election unopposed.

Personal life
Simpson is a member of the United Methodist Church.

References

External links
Official page at the Wyoming Legislature
Profile at Ballotpedia

1961 births
Living people
Republican Party Wyoming state senators
University of Wyoming alumni
Chadron State College alumni
21st-century American politicians
People from Lusk, Wyoming
People from Gillette, Wyoming
American United Methodists